Bruce Alexander Cook (1932 – November 9, 2003) was an American journalist and author who also wrote under the pseudonym Bruce Alexander, creating historical novels about a blind 18th-century Englishman and also a 20th-century Mexican-American detective.

Biography
Cook was born in 1932 in Chicago. His family moved often as a child, his father being a train dispatcher with frequent new assignments. He earned a degree in literature from Loyola University (Chicago).

His first wife was Catherine Coghlan, with whom he had three children, Catherine (Katy), Bob, and Ceci. He married concert violinist Judith Aller in 1994.

He served as a translator in the U.S. Army in Frankfurt, Germany, in the late 1950s, and also did public relations work. He joined the editorial staff of the National Observer in Washington D.C. in 1967, and covered movies, books, and music. When that newspaper folded, he became book editor of USA Today, the Detroit News, and then the Los Angeles Daily News (from 1984 to 1990). He was a senior editor at Newsweek. In the meantime, he was writing as a free-lance, selling to such publications as the National Catholic Reporter.

He died of a stroke November 9, 2003, in Hollywood Presbyterian Medical Center, Hollywood, California.

Books
Cook's first book was a nonfiction work, The Beat Generation, published by Charles Scribner's Sons in 1971. A biography of screenwriter Dalton Trumbo followed in 1977, and in 2015 it was made into a film by the same name. His first novel was Chicago-based Sex Life, in 1978.

He wrote four novels featuring Los Angeles detective Antonio "Chico" Cervantes — Mexican Standoff, 1988, Rough Cut, 1990, Death as a Career Move, 1992, and Sidewalk Hilton, 1994. He also wrote a series of novels about the blind magistrate Sir John Fielding, the real-life founder of London's first police force.

His later nonfiction works were Listen to the Blues, a musical history, in 1973; Brecht in Exile,  about the German writer Bertold Brecht, in 1983; and The Town That Country Built: Welcome to Branson, Missouri, in 1993.  His final books, published posthumously, were Young Will: The Confessions of William Shakespeare and a Fielding book, Rules of Engagement, for which his widow and writer John Shannon put on the finishing touches.

<books in order, according to Rehoboth Beach Public Library and Amazon.com editions available to me: [Note: page counts vary with hard or soft back editions.]>

1.  "Blind Justice" (1994) 323 pp.

2.  "Murder in Grub Street" (1995) 276 pp.

3.  "Watery Grave" (1996) 265 pp.

4.  "Person or Persons Unknown" (1997) 279 pp.

5.  "Jack, Knave and Fool" (1998) 279 pp.

6.  "Death of a Colonial" (1999) 275 pp.

7.  "The Color of Death" (2000) 279 pp.

8.  "Smuggler's Moon" (2001) 247 pp.

9.  "An Experiment in Treason" (2002) 324 pp.

10. "The Price of Murder" (2003) 257 pp.

11. "Rules of Engagement" (2005) 288 pp. Posthumously published.

References

External links
 Author Website
 Interview with Tom Nolan in January magazine, fall 1999.
 Fantastic Fiction Author Page

American mystery writers
American historical novelists
Writers of historical fiction set in the modern age
2003 deaths
1932 births
Writers from Chicago
Loyola University Chicago alumni
USA Today people
The Detroit News people
Newsweek people
American male novelists
Writers of historical mysteries
20th-century American novelists
20th-century American male writers
Novelists from Illinois
Novelists from Michigan
20th-century American non-fiction writers
American male non-fiction writers
20th-century pseudonymous writers